Meka Robotics was a San Francisco based company that made robotic systems.

History
Founded in 2006 by Aaron Edsinger and Jeff Weber, it was originally a spin-off of the MIT Computer Science and Artificial Intelligence Laboratory before the founders relocated to San Francisco.

In 2007, the company provided a forearm and hand for MIT Media Lab's new robot, Nexi.

In 2008, the company teamed with the Socially Intelligent Machines Lab at the Georgia Institute of Technology to develop Simon, an upper torso humanoid platform for human robot interaction.

In 2012, the company teamed with the Human Centered Robotics Group at the University of Texas at Austin to develop HUME, a "bipedal robot for human-centered hyper-agility."

In 2012, the company entered into a joint venture with Willow Garage and SRI International to found Redwood Robotics, a company specializing in robotic arms.

On December 5, 2013, Google X acquired Meka Robotics.

Products

 M1 Mobile Manipulator

 S2 Humanoid Head

See also
 Domo (robot)

References

External links 
 

Defunct robotics companies of the United States
Companies based in San Francisco
Technology companies based in the San Francisco Bay Area
2006 establishments in California
Google acquisitions